Milo is a village in Vernon County, Missouri, United States. The population was 90 at the 2010 census.

History
Milo was platted in 1881 when the railroad was extended to that point. The community has the name of Milo Main, an early settler. A post office has been in operation at Milo since 1883.

Geography
Milo is located just east of US Route 71 approximately six miles south of Nevada and 6.5 miles north of the community of Sheldon.

Demographics

2010 census
As of the census of 2010, there were 90 people, 32 households, and 22 families living in the village. The racial makeup of the village was 96.7% White and 3.3% Native American. Hispanic or Latino of any race were 1.1% of the population.

There were 32 households, of which 43.8% had children under the age of 18 living with them, 59.4% were married couples living together, 6.3% had a female householder with no husband present, 3.1% had a male householder with no wife present, and 31.3% were non-families. 21.9% of all households were made up of individuals, and 6.3% had someone living alone who was 65 years of age or older. The average household size was 2.81 and the average family size was 3.50.

The median age in the village was 37 years. 28.9% of residents were under the age of 18; 8.9% were between the ages of 18 and 24; 23.4% were from 25 to 44; 25.6% were from 45 to 64; and 13.3% were 65 years of age or older. The gender makeup of the village was 45.6% male and 54.4% female.

2000 census
As of the census of 2000, there were 84 people, 32 households, and 23 families living in the village. The population density was 1,094.3 people per square mile (405.4/km2). There were 35 housing units at an average density of 456.0 per square mile (168.9/km2). The racial makeup of the village was 98.81% White and 1.19% Native American. Hispanic or Latino of any race were 1.19% of the population.

There were 32 households, out of which 37.5% had children under the age of 18 living with them, 56.3% were married couples living together, 9.4% had a female householder with no husband present, and 28.1% were non-families. 21.9% of all households were made up of individuals, and 15.6% had someone living alone who was 65 years of age or older. The average household size was 2.63 and the average family size was 3.09.

In the village, the population was spread out, with 33.3% under the age of 18, 7.1% from 18 to 24, 23.8% from 25 to 44, 26.2% from 45 to 64, and 9.5% who were 65 years of age or older. The median age was 34 years. For every 100 females, there were 95.3 males. For every 100 females age 18 and over, there were 93.1 males.

The median income for a household in the village was $23,125, and the median income for a family was $28,333. Males had a median income of $20,750 versus $23,125 for females. The per capita income for the village was $11,887. There were 13.6% of families and 15.4% of the population living below the poverty line, including 19.0% of under eighteens and none of those over 64.

References

Villages in Vernon County, Missouri
Villages in Missouri